Mircea Bolba (31 October 1961 – 6 January 2021) was a Romanian football midfielder and manager.

Career
As a footballer, Bolba played for Olimpia Satu Mare, Steaua București, ASA Târgu Mureș, Politehnica Timișoara and FC Bihor Oradea, among others. After retirement, Bolba started his career as a manager, coaching over years especially teams from Satu Mare County, such as Olimpia Satu Mare (several times), Fink Fester Petrești, Talna Orașu Nou or Turul Micula. Bolba also managed other teams, especially from the region of Transylvania, among them Arieșul Turda, Silvania Șimleu Silvaniei, Unirea Dej or Someșul Dej.

Mircea Bolba died in the morning of 6 January 2021, at the age of 59. At the moment of death, he was the manager of Olimpia MCMXXI Satu Mare, a fan-owned football club and also a phoenix club of Olimpia Satu Mare.

Bolba died from COVID-19 in 2020.

References

External links

1961 births
2021 deaths
People from Satu Mare County
Romanian footballers
Association football midfielders
Romania youth international footballers
Liga I players
Liga II players
FC Olimpia Satu Mare players
FC Steaua București players
ASA Târgu Mureș (1962) players
FC Politehnica Timișoara players
FC Bihor Oradea players
FC Inter Sibiu players
Cypriot First Division players
Evagoras Paphos players
Romanian football managers
FC Olimpia Satu Mare managers
FC Unirea Dej managers
Deaths from the COVID-19 pandemic in Romania